Rock'n Roll is a 1994 compilation album by the New York Dolls. It features all the songs from their self-titled album, with the exception of their cover of Bo Diddley's song "Pills", and selections from Too Much Too Soon. There are also three unreleased tracks: "Courageous Cat Theme", which was recorded for a commercial during the sessions for the second album and demos of band composed, "Lone Star Queen" and a cover of "Don't Mess With Cupid".

This is the first remastered release of NY Dolls recordings. 24-bit remasters of the complete studio albums were released in 2006 in a limited edition in Japan.

Track listing
"Courageous Cat Theme" (Johnny Holiday) - 2:19
"Trash" (Sylvain Sylvain, David Johansen) - 3:07
"Personality Crisis" (Johnny Thunders, Johansen) - 3:41
"Babylon" (Thunders, Johansen) - 3:32
"Looking for a Kiss" (Johansen) - 3:17
"Lone Star Queen" (Johansen, Thunders, Sylvain, Arthur "Killer" Kane, Jerry Nolan) - 4:10
"Vietnamese Baby" (Johansen) - 3:37
"Lonely Planet Boy" (Johansen) - 4:07
"Frankenstein" (Sylvain, Johansen) - 5:57
"Private World" (Thunders, Johansen) - 3:37
"Chatterbox" (Thunders) - 2:25
"Bad Girl" (Thunders, Johansen) - 3:02
"Don't Mess with Cupid" (Deanie Parker, Eddie Floyd, Steve Cropper) - 2:51
"Subway Train" (Thunders, Johansen) - 4:19
"Who Are the Mystery Girls?" (Thunders, Johansen) - 3:08
"Stranded in the Jungle" (Ernestine Smith, James Johnson) - 4:04
"It's Too Late" (Thunders, Johansen) - 4:40
"Puss 'n' Boots" (Sylvain, Johansen) - 3:05
"Jet Boy" (Thunders, Johansen) - 4:39
"Human Being" (Thunders, Johansen) - 5:44

References 

New York Dolls albums
1994 compilation albums
Mercury Records compilation albums